Consuelo Montagu, Duchess of Manchester (1853 – 20 November 1909), née María Francisca de la Consolación "Consuelo" Yznaga (also spelled Iznaga by some sources), was a Cuban American heiress who married George, Viscount Mandeville, in 1876. She became the Duchess of Manchester when her husband succeeded to the dukedom in March 1890.

Family background

Consuelo Yznaga was born in 1853, in New York City, the second of four children of diplomat Antonio Modesto Yznaga del Valle (Trinidad, Cuba, Spain, 28 December 1823 – Manhattan, New York, New York County, New York, 28 May 1892) and wife (1850) Ellen Maria Clement of Ravenswood Plantation, Concordia Parish, Louisiana (Upstate New York, 1833 – Natchez, Adams County, Mississippi, 24 January 1908), paternal granddaughter of José Antonio Yznaga y Borrell and wife María Francisca del Valle y Castillo and maternal granddaughter of the steamboat Captain and plantation owner Samuel Clement from Dutchess County, New York, and wife Maria Augusta Little, daughter of William Little and wife Frances Boyd. Her father was from an old Cuban family that owned a large plantation (Torre Iznaga) and sugar mills in the vicinity of Trinidad, Cuba; they had connections to several Spanish aristocratic families.

She grew up at Ravenswood Plantation in Concordia Parish, Louisiana, which she inherited when her parents died.  Her parents acquired properties in New York and in Newport, Rhode Island, while retaining the plantations in Cuba and Louisiana.

Her sister, María de la Natividad "Natica" Yznaga, married Sir John Lister-Kaye, 3rd Baronet (1853–1924) on 5 December 1881. Her brother, Fernando Yznaga (1850–1901), was married to Mary Virginia "Jennie" Smith, sister of Alva Smith Vanderbilt Belmont, Consuelo's childhood best friend. Vanderbilt's daughter Consuelo Vanderbilt was her god-daughter and named after her.

Life and activities
In her teenage years, she became known on New York's social scene as one of the group called the Buccaneers. During her marriage, she engaged herself in charitable organizations. Poverty was a cause that concerned her, and she was also interested in education and health.

The Duchess of Manchester was a renowned beauty, as were her sisters – Emilie Yznaga  and Natividad (Natica) Yznaga.

The Duchess was a celebrated society figure, belonging to the intimate circle of Edward VII of the United Kingdom, formerly the Prince of Wales. Shortly before her death, she entertained King Edward and Nicholas II, the Tsar of Russia, while the Tsar was on a visit to England.

Upon her brother's death in 1901, he left her $2 million ($60 million in 2018 rate).

Marriage and issue
In the autumn of 1875, she met George Montagu, Viscount Mandeville (1853–1892), at her father's country home in Morristown, New Jersey. On 22 May 1876, at Grace Church, Manhattan, New York, New York County, New York, she married Viscount Mandeville. Her dowry was $6 million (in 2018 rate). After their marriage, they settled on the Duke of Manchester's estate centered on Tandragee Castle in County Armagh in Ulster, Ireland.

They had one son and twin daughters: 
 William Montagu, 9th Duke of Manchester (1877–1947), who married, firstly, Helena Zimmerman, in 1900, and had issue. They divorced in 1931, and later that same year, he married Kathleen Dawes (d. 1966), on 17 December 1931.
 Lady Jacqueline Mary Alva Montagu, known as "May" (1879–1895), who, although not diagnosed before she died, is commonly believed to have died of consumption.
 Lady Alice Eleanor Louise Montagu, known as "Nell" (1879–1900), who died of consumption.
Her fortune was soon lost to her husband's habits in less than ten years. Viscount Mandeville spent such a lot of cash on gambling and mistresses that his father the 7th Duke banished the couple to the family castle in Ireland until 1883.

Death and legacy
The Duchess died of neuritis in Westminster on 20 November 1909. At her bedside upon her death were her sisters, Lady Lister-Kaye and Emily Yznaga. Her estate, valued at $2,493,131 (an approximate value of $69 million in 2017 rates), was left to her various family members.

On her death in 1909, the Duchess bequeathed a ruby and diamond bracelet to her friend Queen Alexandra. The Manchester Tiara, created for the Duchess by Cartier in 1903, is now in the collection of the Victoria and Albert Museum, London. In 2007 the Manchester Tiara was accepted by the British government in lieu of inheritance tax following the death of the 12th Duke. Her diamond and emerald necklace, originally bequeathed to her grandson Viscount Mandeville, was auctioned by Sotheby's in 2015.

References

1853 births
1909 deaths
People from Concordia Parish, Louisiana
Consuelo Montagu
British duchesses by marriage
American people of Cuban descent
British people of Cuban descent
American emigrants to England
Gilded Age